Consort Li may refer to:

Consorts with surname Li 李

Ancient China

 Li Zhaoyi  (李昭儀), consort of emperor Liu Shan of Shu Han state during the Three Kingdoms period.

  (衛婕妤), titled Jieyu (婕妤), original name Li Ping (李平), taking the surname Wei from her predecessor Empress Wei, concubine of Emperor Cheng of Han.
 Li Chunyan, concubine and later empress consort of Emperor Wang Jipeng of Min.
  (李丽姬), also titled Li Lifei (李丽妃), concubine of Emperor Liu Sheng of Southern Han.
 Consort Li (李宸妃), concubine of Emperor Zhenzong of Song and mother of Emperor Renzong.
  (李元妃), concubine of Emperor Shizong of Jin, mother of Wanyan Yongdao (完顏永蹈), Wanyan Yongji and Wanyan Yongde (完顏永德).
  (李淑妃), concubine of Ming Dynasty's Hongwu Emperor, mother of Crown Prince Zhu Biao and Princes Zhu Shuang and Zhu Gang (朱棡).
  (李贤妃), concubine of Hongwu Emperor, mother of Zhu Jing (朱桱).
  (李贤妃), concubine of Hongxi Emperor.
  (李丽妃), concubine of Hongxi Emperor.
  (李康妃), concubine of Taichang Emperor, adoptive mother of Tianqi and Chongzhen Emperors.
  (李莊妃), concubine of Taichang Emperor, adoptive mother of Chongzhen Emperor.

Ancient Korea
 Ingyeong Hyeon-Bi Lee-ssi (仁敬賢妃 李氏, 인경현비 이씨), concubine of King Munjong of Goryeo.
 Injeol Hyeon-Bi Lee-ssi (仁節賢妃 李氏, 인절현비 이씨), concubine of King Munjong of Goryeo.

Consorts with surname Li 栗
  (栗姬), concubine of Emperor Jing of Han, known for her beauty

Consorts with surname Li 驪
 Consort Li (驪姬), wife of Duke Xian of Jin.

Elegant Consorts 麗妃
  (趙麗妃), concubine of Emperor Xuanzong of Tang (Emperor Ming), mother of Deposed Crown Prince Li Ying.
  (唐括石哥), titled as Lifei (麗妃), concubine of Deposed Emperor Wanyan Liang of Jin, mother of Wanyan Shensiabu (完顏矧思阿補).
  (葛麗妃), concubine of Ming Dynasty's Hongwu Emperor, mother of Zhu Yi (朱㰘) and Zhu Nan (朱楠).
  (陈丽妃), concubine of Yongle Emperor.
 Consort Han (韩丽妃), concubine of Yongle Emperor.
  (王丽妃), concubine of Hongxi Emperor.
  (袁丽妃), concubine of Xuande Emperor.
  (劉麗妃), concubine of Emperor Yingzong of Ming.
  (章丽妃), concubine of Chenghua Emperor.
  (阎贵妃), once titled as Lifei (丽妃), concubine of Jiajing Emperor.
  (王丽妃), concubine of Jiajing Emperor.
 Imperial Noble Consort Zhuangjing, titled as Lifei (麗妃), concubine of the Qing Dynasty's Xianfeng Emperor.